Gaultheria puradyatmikae is a multi-branched terrestrial shrub growing up to  tall, endemic to disturbed mid-montane areas of Mount Jaya, in Papua Province of Indonesia on the western half of the island New Guinea. The plant appears to be endemic to Mount Jaya. It was described in 2020 based on two prior collected specimens and new observations in the field. The specific epithet refers to Pratita Puradyatmika, the General Supervisor of Highland Reclamation and Monitoring at the PT Freeport Indonesia Mining Company, who worked with biologists over many years to undertake biodiversity inventories in and around the region.

References 

Plants described in 2020
puradyatmikae
Flora of New Guinea